The Pishin Valley is located in Pishin District, Balochistan, Pakistan. It is located 50km away from the provincial capital - Quetta, and is filled with numerous orchards.

References

Populated places in Balochistan, Pakistan
Pishin District